Marcos Ramírez (born March 31, 1981) is an American former professional boxer who competed from 2000 to 2008. Ramírez is a former WBO-NABO and IBF Latino featherweight champion.

Personal life
Marcos a current firefighter, was once 21-0 and on the fast track to a shot at the world Featherweight championship. Until his first-born son, Diego, died unexpectedly in January 2006 at the age of 13 months. All Ramírez knows is that there was a fever that did not subside. He lost his passion for boxing after Diego's death. After a brief comeback, he retired from boxing in 2008 with a career record of 25–1. "It changed who I was," Ramírez says during his shift as a back-end man at the firehouse. "A big chunk of my heart was ripped out."

Professional career
On October 4, 2008, Ramírez fought Yuriorkis Gamboa after a long layoff and had Gamboa staggered in the first round but would go on to lose the bout.

References

External links

American boxers of Mexican descent
Featherweight boxers
Boxers from Iowa
Sportspeople from Des Moines, Iowa
1981 births
Living people
American male boxers